The list of current and past Rajya Sabha members from the Manipur State. State elect 1 member for the term of 6 years and indirectly elected by the state legislators, since year 1972.

List of all Rajya Sabha members from Manipur state 
Source:

References

External links
Rajya Sabha homepage hosted by the Indian government
List of Sitting Members of Rajya Sabha (Term Wise) 
MEMBERS OF RAJYA SABHA (STATE WISE RETIREMENT LIST) 

Manipur
 
Rajya Sabha